Jimmy Rice may refer to:

Jimmy Ryce (1985–1995), American crime victim 
Jim Rice (born 1953), American baseball player

See also
James Rice (disambiguation)